Chen Liang-gee (born 23 September 1956) is a Taiwanese engineer and politician who served as Minister of Science and Technology from 8 February 2017 to 20 May 2020.

Early life
Chen was born in September 1956. He comes from a rural, peanut-farming family.  Chen obtained his bachelor's, master's and doctoral degree in electrical engineering from National Cheng Kung University in 1979, 1981 and 1986 respectively.

Academic career
Chen is a professor of electrical engineering at National Taiwan University. He does research on video coding, circuits, chips, algorithms, and signal processing. From 2009 to 2012, he was deputy dean of college of EECS. From 2013 to 2016, he was the EVP of academic and research at National Taiwan University. Chen is a Fellow of the Institute of Electrical and Electronics Engineers from 2001.

Political career
Chen was appointed deputy minister of education on 20 April 2016 by Premier-designate Lin Chuan. In February 2017, Chen was named Minister of Science and Technology. As technology minister, Chen supported the Tsai Ing-wen administration's Forward-looking Infrastructure Construction Project, and sought to expand the use of educational technology and artificial intelligence in Taiwan. Chen remained technology minister under Lin and his successors William Lai and Su Tseng-chang. Chen resigned his post on 14 May 2020.

References

External links

 

1956 births
Living people
Ministers of Science and Technology of the Republic of China
National Cheng Kung University alumni
Politicians of the Republic of China on Taiwan from Yunlin County